Bit-O-Honey is an American candy product; it first appeared in 1928 and was made by the Schutter-Johnson Company of Chicago, Illinois. Bit-O-Honey was a new kind of candy bar consisting of six pieces wrapped in waxed paper and then packaged in a cover wrapper. The candy consists of almond bits embedded in a honey-flavored taffy, which makes for a long-chewing candy.  Both a large bar and a small, bite-sized version are available for sale, the latter in bags of multiple units.

In 1969, Schutter-Johnson was merged into the Ward Candy Company of New York City, makers of other candies, including Oh Henry! and Raisinets.  Between the mid- and late-1970s, a chocolate-flavored version called Bit-O-Chocolate was made, but this product was later dropped. 

Other spin-offs included Bit o' Licorice and Bit-O-Peanut Butter. In 2017, Bit-O-Honey Chocolate was reintroduced.

Bit-O-Honey and Ward's other brands were acquired by Chicago-based Terson Company in 1981. The eventual sale of Bit-O-Honey brand happened in 1984, when the Terson Company sold Ward Candy Segment brands to Nestlé Company on January 9, 1984. 

In May 2013, Nestlé sold the Bit-O-Honey brand to the Pearson's Candy Company of Saint Paul, Minnesota. Spangler Candy Company acquired the brand in November 2020.

Bit-O-Honey is similar in style and packaging (single pieces) to Mary Jane made by Necco.  Its ingredients as of 2022 are corn syrup, sugar, nonfat milk, hydrogenated coconut oil, almonds (almonds, canola and/or safflower and/or sunflower oil), honey, salt, egg whites, modified soy protein, natural flavor.

See also
 Squirrel Nut Zippers

References

External links
 Nutritional Data
 Wrapped Bulk Candy Ingredients

Candy bars
Almond dishes
Products introduced in 1924
Brand name confectionery
Honey dishes